Notre Dame Academy is a private, all-girls Roman Catholic high school in Hingham, Massachusetts.  It is located in the Roman Catholic Archdiocese of Boston.

History

Notre Dame Academy (NDA), sponsored by the Sisters of Notre Dame de Namur, is the oldest Catholic day academy for girls in New England.  Located in Hingham, MA since 1965, it has its roots in two earlier academies: Notre Dame Academy, Boston (Lancaster Street, Berkeley Street, the Fenway, Granby Street) begun in 1853, and Notre Dame Academy, Roxbury, opened in 1854.

Sisters of Notre Dame traveled to the east coast from Cincinnati to found the academies.  The Boston Academy began in a simple wooden structure (Lancaster Street) and, within ten years, the flourishing school needed to move to a larger facility.  For the next fifty years, the academy radiated a strong religious and intellectual influence from its Berkeley Street campus.  As the area became a booming industrial center in the city, it was no longer conducive for the Academy and so the school moved once again.  In 1916, the school moved to 400 The Fenway and, by 1919, shared the location with the new Emmanuel College.  As the college grew, the Academy moved once again, to Granby Street.  The Boston Academy continued to flourish at this site until 1954.

Notre Dame Academy at Washington Street in the Roxbury section of Boston began in 1854 as a day school and boarding school.  In 1954, the students from the Granby Street School joined the students at the Roxbury campus and there was one Academy in the city.  As the city changed and the needs of the south shore increased, the school relocated to the present Hingham campus. Today, to meet the needs of the current student body, NDA is rebuilding at the Hingham campus and expanding its facilities.

For over 155 years, the Sisters of Notre Dame de Namur and their lay colleagues have provided a college preparatory education to young women, encompassing the spiritual, intellectual, social, and physical development of their students.

Campus

The school is located on a  campus. The academic building consists of a chapel, auditorium, classrooms, science labs, art rooms, music and choral rooms, library, computer labs, the Maribeth Merrigan Multi Media Learning Center, guidance center, gymnasium, cafeteria, offices, and meeting rooms. The campus includes a memorial garden; three athletic fields for soccer, field hockey, softball, and lacrosse; an eight-lane track; and five tennis courts.

Student body

Students come to NDA from over 40 towns across the South Shore and surrounding areas.  They travel south from Norwood, Westwood, and Boston.  Some travel northeast from the Brockton area and others travel north along the Route 3 corridor from towns such as Plymouth, Kingston, and from Cape Cod. Students come from a variety of public, private and parochial schools.

Notable alumnae
 Geneva Duker, dancer
 Maura Tierney, actress

Notes and references

External links
 School Website

Girls' schools in Massachusetts
Catholic secondary schools in Massachusetts
Schools in Plymouth County, Massachusetts
Sisters of Notre Dame de Namur schools
Educational institutions established in 1853
Buildings and structures in Hingham, Massachusetts
1853 establishments in Massachusetts